Holly Lang is a New York-based writer, editor and consultant. She was the founding editor of Pine Magazine, an award-winning online-only publication based in Atlanta. She has worked as a reporter for publications and news outlets, including the Birmingham Post-Herald, Southeast Performer and The Associated Press.

Bibliography
Dr. Dre (2006, Greenwood Publishing Group)
The Notorious B.I.G.: A Biography (2007, Greenwood Publishing Group)
How to Procrastinate (Knock Knock Publishing)
Goodnight Girl

References

American magazine writers
American women writers
Year of birth missing (living people)
Living people
21st-century American women